Paracas District is one of eight districts of the province Pisco in Peru.

References

1951 establishments in Peru
States and territories established in 1951